Major General Ian Campbell Gordon,  (born 20 March 1952) is a retired senior officer of the Australian Army. He had a long and distinguished career culminating as Deputy Chief of Army (2004–2006) and Chief of Staff of the United Nations Truce Supervision Organization (2006–2008).

Early life
Gordon was born in Perth, Western Australia, on 20 March 1952 to Glenice Pascoe and Ivor Gordon, a decorated bomber pilot who flew with No. 455 Squadron RAAF in the Second World War. Educated at Swanbourne High School, Gordon entered the Royal Military College, Duntroon as an officer cadet in 1970. He graduated in 1973 with a Bachelor of Science in Military Studies, and was commissioned as a lieutenant in the Royal Australian Corps of Signals.

Military career
Gordon graduated from the Royal Military College, Duntroon, in 1973 and was commissioned into the Royal Australian Corps of Signals. He graduated from the Royal Military College of Science in Shrivenham, United Kingdom, in 1983, and from the Australian Command and Staff College in 1985.

By 1990, Gordon was posted to command the 1st Signals Regiment in Brisbane. The following year, he was made commander of the Australian Service Contingent to the United Nations Mission for the Referendum in Western Sahara (MINURSO). For his command of the 1st Signals Regiment and work with MINURSO, Gordon was appointed a Member of the Order of Australia in 1992. In 1993, Gordon was named Director of the Royal Australian Corps of Signals. He graduated from the Australian Centre for Defence and Strategic Studies in 1996 and, in 1998, was appointed Commandant of the Australian Command and Staff College. He was appointed Director-General Personnel – Army in 2000, and Director-General, Future Land Warfare in 2001. That September, he was promoted to major general and appointed Deputy Force Commander in the United Nations Transitional Administration in East Timor (UNTAET).

Gordon returned to Australia in 2002 and was appointed Commander, Training Command – Army. He became Deputy Chief of Army in May 2004, and was appointed an Officer of the Order of Australia for his distinguished service to the Australian Defence Force in senior command and staff appointments in January 2006. In November the same year, he was appointed Chief of Staff of the United Nations Truce Supervision Organization (UNTSO).

Personal
Gordon is married to Ula and they have three children: Tom, Alison and Jenny. His hobbies include scuba diving, touch rugby, restoring cars, reading and bushwalking. Since retiring from the Australian Army, Gordon has owned and managed a small publishing business, Barrallier Books, which has a focus on deluxe books and fine writing.

References

|-

1952 births
Australian generals
Military personnel from Western Australia
United Nations military personnel
Australian publishers (people)
Living people
Officers of the Order of Australia
People from Perth, Western Australia
Royal Military College, Duntroon graduates
University of New South Wales alumni